Sir Horatio (Horace) Mann, 2nd Baronet (2 February 1744 – 2 April 1814) was a British politician who sat in the House of Commons between 1774 and 1807. He is remembered as a member of the Hambledon Club in Hampshire and a patron of Kent cricket. He was an occasional player but rarely in first-class matches.

Early life
Mann was the only surviving son of Galfridus Mann, an army clothier, of Boughton Place in Boughton Malherbe, Kent and his wife, Sarah Gregory, daughter of John Gregory of London. He was educated at Charterhouse School and entered Peterhouse, Cambridge in 1760. His father died on 21 December 1756 and he succeeded to his estates at Boughton and Linton. He also inherited over £100,000 from his father. Mann married  Lady Lucy Noel, daughter of Baptist Noel, 4th Earl of Gainsborough, on 13 April 1765.

Cricket

Mann had a number of influential friends including John Frederick Sackville, 3rd Duke of Dorset, with whom he shared a keen cricketing rivalry. He owned Boughton Place in Boughton Malherbe and Linton Park in Linton, both near Maidstone, and  later had his family seat at Bourne Park House, near Canterbury. Within its grounds he had his own cricket ground Bourne Paddock which staged many first-class matches in the 1770s and 1780s. He later moved to Dandelion, Kent, near Margate, and established another ground there which was used for some first-class games towards the end of the 18th century.

Mann was a member of the Committee of Noblemen and Gentlemen of Kent, Hampshire, Surrey, Sussex, Middlesex and London. He was a member of the committee at The Star and Garter in Pall Mall, which drew up a new revision of the Laws of Cricket on 25 February 1774.

Political career
Mann was nephew of Sir Horace Mann, 1st Baronet who was a British diplomat in Tuscany from 1738 to 1786. He was knighted on 10 June 1772, to act as proxy for his uncle at the installation of the Bath.

Mann's ownership of Linton gave him electoral interest at  Maidstone. At the 1774 general election he contested Maidstone, having deferred a planned journey abroad for his wife's health. He topped the poll and was returned as Member of Parliament for the seat.  In 1775 his uncle made over to him the family estate at Bourne, in return for an annuity.  He did go abroad and after visiting France, Tuscany, and Austria, returned to England in November 1778. From then on he travelled to his uncle in Florence nearly every summer. At the 1780 general election he was again returned for Maidstone at the head of the poll. He  joined Brooks in 1780, and was a member of the St. Alban's Tavern group of country gentlemen who tried to reconcile Fox and Pitt.  He did not stand in the  1784 general election.

Mann was in Florence when his uncle died on 6 November 1786 and succeeded to the baronetcy as second baronet. He acted as chargé d'affaires in Florence for six months. He was angered by the poor recompense he received for his services and returned to Italy in 1788 ostensibly to sort out the financial problems which resulted from running his uncle's establishment.

Mann joined the Whig Club in January 1790 and at the following 1790 general election was elected in a contest as MP for Sandwich.  He was returned unopposed in 1796 and 1802. By this time he was becoming increasingly absent in parliament mainly through ill-health when gout struck him. He avoided a contest and was returned in the 1806 general election, but was defeated in 1807.

Later life and legacy
Mann was described by Samuel Egerton Brydges  as a wild, fickle, rattling man, who made no impression. In 1811 it was said that his estate would have been the largest in Kent but by his extravagance he reduced his income to not more than £4,000 a year. He died on 2 April 1814. He had three daughters, but no son and the baronetcy became extinct. His property went to his nephew James Cornwallis. Cornwallis's father wrote soon after "My son has had a great deal of trouble in consequence of succeeding a person really ruined. The sums Sir Horace expended are beyond all belief, or rather squandered."

Mann is variously called Sir Horatio and Sir Horace in the sources. Horace was used as a diminutive of Horatio so both names can be regarded as correct usage. He was always called Horace in Scores and Biographies, the main source for his cricketing activities.

References

Further reading
 A Dictionary of British and Irish Travellers in Italy, 1701–1800, Compiled from the Brinsley Ford Archive by John Ingamells, Yale, 1997.

1744 births
1814 deaths
People from the Borough of Maidstone
People educated at Charterhouse School
Members of the Parliament of Great Britain for English constituencies
British MPs 1774–1780
British MPs 1780–1784
British MPs 1790–1796
British MPs 1796–1800
Members of the Parliament of the United Kingdom for English constituencies
UK MPs 1801–1802
UK MPs 1802–1806
UK MPs 1806–1807
Baronets in the Baronetage of Great Britain
English cricketers
English cricketers of 1787 to 1825
English cricketers of 1701 to 1786
Kent cricketers
Cricket patrons
People from Boughton Malherbe